DXCC (828 AM) Radyo Trabaho is a radio station owned and operated by the Radio Mindanao Network. The station's studio is located at RMN Broadcast Center (Canoy Bldg.), Don Apolinario Velez St., Cagayan de Oro, and the transmitter is located at Brgy. Taboc, Opol, Misamis Oriental. Established on August 28, 1952, DXCC is the pioneer radio station in the city and serves as the first and co-flagship station of RMN Network.

References

Radio stations in Cagayan de Oro
Radio stations established in 1952
News and talk radio stations in the Philippines
Radio Mindanao Network stations